Strange Justice is a 1932 American pre-Code drama film directed by Victor Schertzinger, written by William A. Drake, and starring Marian Marsh, Reginald Denny, Richard Bennett, Norman Foster and Irving Pichel. It was released on October 7, 1932, by RKO Pictures.

Cast 
Marian Marsh as Rose Abbott
Reginald Denny as Henry I. Judson
Richard Bennett as Kearney
Norman Foster as Wally Baker
Irving Pichel as L.D. Waters
Nydia Westman as Gwen
Thomas E. Jackson as Smith

References

External links 
 

1932 films
American black-and-white films
Films directed by Victor Schertzinger
1932 drama films
American drama films
1930s English-language films
1930s American films